We Get By is the fourteenth studio album by American R&B, soul and gospel singer Mavis Staples. It was released on May 24, 2019, by Anti-.

The album's cover features the photograph "Outside Looking In" by Gordon Parks from his 1956 photo essay The Restraints: Open and Hidden. The album was chosen as a 'Favorite Blues Album' by AllMusic.

Background
The album was announced on March 20, 2019. It was produced and written by Ben Harper. Staples and Harper had previously collaborated on "Love and Trust", a song from Staples' 2016 album, Livin' on a High Note. The album's lead single, "Change", was released on the same day, along with the album's pre-order. In a statement, Staples said, "These songs are delivering such a strong message. We truly need to make a change if we want this world to be better."

Track listing

Charts

References

2019 albums
Mavis Staples albums
Anti- (record label) albums
Albums produced by Ben Harper